GoldenEye: Original Motion Picture Soundtrack from the United Artists film is the soundtrack to the James Bond film of the same name and was composed by Éric Serra. It was released by EMI on November 14, 1995. Serra composed and performed a number of synthesizer tracks, including the radically reworked version of the James Bond Theme that plays during the gun barrel sequence, while John Altman and David Arch provided the more traditional symphonic music. The producers hired composer John Altman to write a more traditional, orchestral score piece for the tank-chase scene in St. Petersburg. Serra's original, unused track for that sequence can still be found on the soundtrack album as "A Pleasant Drive in St. Petersburg".

The theme song "GoldenEye" was written by Bono and The Edge of rock band U2 and was performed by Tina Turner. The song was later covered by Nicole Scherzinger for the 2010 remake of the GoldenEye 007 video game.

The Swedish pop band Ace of Base was also involved at one point, producing a different theme song—also called "GoldenEye"—which does not appear in the film or soundtrack. This song was later released with slightly revised lyrics as "The Juvenile" on their 2002 album Da Capo, replacing the word "GoldenEye" with "Juvenile".

The soundtrack does not feature the comedic rendition of the Tammy Wynette song "Stand By Your Man" from the film, which was sung by Minnie Driver.

Starr Parodi composed a version of the James Bond Theme for the Goldeneye trailer.

Track listing
 "GoldenEye" – Tina Turner
 "The GoldenEye Overture: Half of Everything is Luck / The Other Half is Fate / For England, James"
 "Ladies First"
 "We Share the Same Passions: The Trip to Cuba / The Same Passions"
 "Little Surprise for You: Xenia / D.M. Mishkin"
 "The Severnaya Suite: Among the Dead / Out of Hell / The Husky Tribe"
 "Our Lady of Smolensk"
 "Whispering Statues: Whispers / Two Faced"
 "Run, Shoot, and Jump"
 "A Pleasant Drive in St. Petersburg"
 "Fatal Weakness"
 "That's What Keeps You Alone"
 "Dish out of Water: A Good Squeeze / The Antenna"
 "The Scale to Hell: Boris and the Lethal Pen / I Am Invincible"
 "For Ever, James"
 "The Experience of Love" – Éric Serra

References

External links
 Filmtracks GoldenEye page

Soundtrack albums from James Bond films
Soundtrack
1995 soundtrack albums
Films scored by Éric Serra